Inchaghaun (Gaeilge: Inis an Ghainimh) is an island in County Galway, Ireland.

Demographics

References

Islands of County Galway